Total Football was a British sports magazine on football published by Future Publishing. It was launched in September 1995 as a 'laddish' competitor to FourFourTwo, which had launched the previous year. Total Football and its then-rival Goal were inspired by the success of the 'lad's magazine' Loaded.

Total Football closed in September 2001, with the publisher citing "massive coverage" of football as the reason. Monthly sales were just under 25,000 at the time of its closure, declining from over 80,000 at launch. Another competitor, the BBC's Match of the Day, also closed in 2001; Goal had already suspended publication in 1998 and was later merged into FourFourTwo.

Notes

References

Association football magazines
Sports magazines published in the United Kingdom
Defunct magazines published in the United Kingdom
Football mass media in the United Kingdom
Magazines established in 1995
Magazines disestablished in 2001